SAT-2 was a submarine communications cable linking Melkbosstrand, South Africa, to El Medano, Tenerife Island, Spain and Funchal, Madeira islands, Portugal.
It is the property of Telkom SA Ltd, Telefónica, Marconi, British Telecom, France Cables et Radio, and Deutsche Telekom.

See also
 List of international submarine communications cables

Individual cable systems off the west coast of Africa include:
 ACE
 ATLANTIS-2
 GLO-1
 Main One
 SAT-3/WASC
 WACS

Notes

Submarine communications cables in the North Atlantic Ocean
Submarine communications cables in the South Atlantic Ocean
Internet in Africa
Portugal–South Africa relations
Portugal–Spain relations
British Telecom buildings and structures
Telefónica
Deutsche Telekom
1993 establishments in Portugal
1993 establishments in South Africa
1993 establishments in Spain